The following outline is provided as an overview of and topical guide to the Moon:

Moon – Earth's only permanent natural satellite. It is one of the largest natural satellites in the Solar System, and the largest among planetary satellites relative to the size of the planet that it orbits (its primary). It is the second-densest satellite among those whose densities are known (after Jupiter's satellite Io).

What type of thing is the Moon? 

The Moon can be described as all of the following:

 Natural satellite – celestial body that orbits another celestial body of greater mass (e.g. a planet, star, or dwarf planet), called its primary. For example, the Moon is a natural satellite of Earth, and Earth is a natural satellite of the Sun.

Characteristics of the Moon 

 Atmosphere of the Moon
 Exploration of the Moon
 Geology of the Moon
 Lunar soil
 Lunar water
 Gravitation of the Moon
 Internal structure of the Moon
 Lunar swirls
 Lunar water
 Magnetic field of the Moon
 Moonlight
 Ray system of the Moon
 Sodium tail of the Moon
 Space weathering
 Topography of the Moon
 Transient lunar phenomenon

Selenography of the Moon 

Selenography –  study of the surface and physical features of the Moon. Historically, the principal concern of selenographists was the mapping and naming of the lunar maria, craters, mountain ranges, and other various features. This task was largely finished when high resolution images of the near and far sides of the Moon were obtained by orbiting spacecraft during the early space era. Nevertheless, some regions of the Moon remain poorly imaged (especially near the poles) and the exact locations of many features (like crater depths) are uncertain by several kilometers. 
 Face on the Moon
 Near side of the Moon
 Far side of the Moon

Geographical features on the Moon 

Features on the Moon
 List of lunar features
 Caldera on the Moon
 Lunar craters
 List of craters on the Moon, A-B
 List of craters on the Moon, C-F
 List of craters on the Moon, G-K
 List of craters on the Moon, L-N
 List of craters on the Moon, O-Q
 List of craters on the Moon, R-S
 List of craters on the Moon, T-Z
 Permanently shadowed craters
 Lunar mare
 List of maria on the Moon
 List of mountains on the Moon
 Peak of eternal light
 List of valleys on the Moon
 Volcanic features of the Moon
 List of quadrangles on the Moon
 Lunar poles
 Lunar north pole
 Lunar south pole
 Shackleton (crater)
 South Pole–Aitken basin

Appearance and motion of the Moon 

 Orbit of the Moon
 Lunar phase

History 

 Lunar geologic timescale
 Giant impact hypothesis
 Late Heavy Bombardment

Exploration of the Moon 

 Apollo program
 Exploration of the Moon
 Colonization of the Moon
 List of lunar probes
 List of missions to the Moon
 proposed
 Moon landing
 conspiracy theories
 List of man-made objects on the Moon
 List of current and future lunar missions

Flyby and direct lunar missions 

 Luna programme
 Luna 1
 Luna 2
 Luna 3
 Luna 5
 Luna 6
 Luna 7
 Luna 8
 Luna 9
 Luna 10
 Luna 11
 Luna 12
 Luna 13
 Luna 14
 Luna 15
 Luna 16
 Luna 17
 Luna 18
 Luna 19
 Luna 20
 Luna 21
 Luna 22
 Luna 23
 Luna 24
 Pioneer program
 Pioneer 4
 Ranger program
 Ranger 4
 Ranger 5
 Ranger 6
 Ranger 7
 Ranger 8
 Ranger 9
 Zond program
 Zond 3
 Zond 4
 Zond 5
 Zond 6
 Zond 7
 Zond 8
 Surveyor Program
 Surveyor 2
 Surveyor 3
 Surveyor 4
 Surveyor 5
 Surveyor 6
 Surveyor 7
 Lunar Orbiter program
 Lunar Orbiter 1
 Lunar Orbiter 2
 Lunar Orbiter 3
 Lunar Orbiter 4
 Lunar Orbiter 5
 Apollo program
 Apollo 8
 Apollo 10
 Apollo 11
 Apollo 12
 Apollo 13
 Apollo 14
 Apollo 15
 Apollo 16
 Apollo 17
 Explorer 35
 Explorer 49
 Lunokhod programme
 Lunokhod 1
 Lunokhod 2
 Mariner program
 Mariner 10
 International Cometary Explorer
 Hiten
 GEOTAIL
 Clementine
 PAS-22
 Lunar Prospector
 Nozomi
 SMART-1
 SELENE
 Chinese Lunar Exploration Program
 Chang'e 1
 Chang'e 2
 Chandrayaan-1
 Moon Impact Probe
 Lunar Reconnaissance Orbiter
 LCROSS
 ARTEMIS (THEMIS)
 Gravity Recovery and Interior Laboratory (GRAIL)

Proposed lunar missions 

 Lunar Atmosphere and Dust Environment Explorer (LADEE)
 Google Lunar X Prize
 Moon Express
 Astrobotic Technology
 Chang'e 3
 Chandrayaan-2
 Luna-Glob
 MoonRise
 Colonization of the Moon

See also 

 Outline of space science
 Outline of astronomy
 Outline of space exploration
 Lunar basalt 70017
 Lunar calendar
 Lunisolar calendar
 Craters named after people
 Double planet
 Lunar effect
 Man in the Moon
 Memorials on the Moon
 Month
 Lunar month
 Moon illusion
 Harvest moon
 Hunter's moon
 Moon in art and literature
 Moon in mythology
 Hjúki and Bil (Norse legends)
 Moon is made of green cheese
 Natural satellite
 Solar System
 Supermoon
 Theia
 Tourism

References

External links 

Lunar shelter (building a lunar base with 3D printing)*APOD - Video of lunar drive
 The Moon on Google Maps, a 3-D rendition of the Moon akin to Google Earth

 Cartographic resources
 
 Gazetteer of Planetary Nomenclature (USGS) List of feature names.
 
 3D zoomable globes:
 
 
  Maps and panoramas at Apollo landing sites
 Japan Aerospace Exploration Agency (JAXA) Kaguya (Selene) images
 Large image of the Moon's north pole area

 Observation tools
 
 
  See when the next new crescent moon is visible for any location.

Moon
Moon
Moon